The fourth season of the American sitcom The Big Bang Theory began airing on CBS on September 23, 2010. Melissa Rauch and Mayim Bialik auditioned and were promoted to the main cast during this season as Dr. Bernadette Rostenkowski and Dr. Amy Farrah Fowler respectively. 

Johnny Galecki received a nomination for the Primetime Emmy Award for Outstanding Lead Actor in a Comedy Series at the 63rd Primetime Emmy Awards for the episode "The Benefactor Factor". Jim Parsons won the same award for the episode "The Agreement Dissection".

Production
During the season, Kaley Cuoco's character Penny was absent from episodes 5 and 6 after she fell off a horse and the horse broke her leg. When returning to the series, she was shown working as a bartender instead of waitressing at her usual workplace, The Cheesecake Factory, to hide her injury. In January 2011, The Big Bang Theory was renewed for the next additional three years; extending it through the 2013–2014 season, for a fifth, sixth and seventh season.

Cast

Main cast
 Johnny Galecki as Dr. Leonard Hofstadter
 Jim Parsons as Dr. Sheldon Cooper
 Kaley Cuoco as Penny
 Simon Helberg as Howard Wolowitz
 Kunal Nayyar as Dr. Rajesh "Raj" Koothrappali
 Mayim Bialik as Dr. Amy Farrah Fowler
 Melissa Rauch as Bernadette Rostenkowski

Special guest cast
 Steve Wozniak as himself
 Katee Sackhoff as herself 
 George Takei as himself
 Neil deGrasse Tyson as himself
 LeVar Burton as himself
 Brian Greene as himself

Recurring cast
 Vernee Watson as Althea
 Carol Ann Susi as Mrs. Wolowitz
 Laurie Metcalf as Mary Cooper
 Kevin Sussman as Stuart Bloom
 Aarti Mann as Priya Koothrappali
 Wil Wheaton as himself 
 Brian Thomas Smith as Zack Johnson
 Joshua Malina as President Siebert
 Brian George as Dr. V.M. Koothrappali
 Alice Amter as Mrs. Koothrappali
 John Ross Bowie as Dr. Barry Kripke

Guest cast
 Charlotte Newhouse as Joy 
 Annie O'Donnell as Mrs Fowler
 Eliza Dushku as FBI Agent Angela Paige 
 Keith Carradine as Wyatt
 Rick Fox as Glenn
 Jessica Walter as Mrs Latham
 Christopher Douglas Reed as Todd 
 Lanny Joon as Officer Shin
 Arnold Chun as Ho-Jun
 Eric André as Joey
 Tiffany Dupont as Angela
  Whitney Avalon as Elsie
 Phil Abrams as Dr Bernstein

Episodes

Ratings

Reception 
The fourth season received particular praise for character developments. Alan Sepinwall of Uproxx praised the additions of Bernadette and Amy to the cast, writing that "With Amy Farrah Fowler and Bernadette promoted to semi-permanent status, the show is now able to spend large chunks of each episode focusing only on the women, and in the process has made Penny a much more well-rounded character rather than just a foil for the nerds". Emily VanDerWerff of The A.V. Club wrote that "Jim Parsons and Kaley Cuoco's interplay remains the show's secret weapon", and Eric Hochberger of TV Fanatic wrote: "Really though, everything about the main story worked amazing. Mayim fits in perfectly in The Big Bang Theory cast and played off of Kaley Cuoco just as well as Emmy Award-winning Parsons".

References 

General references

External links

2010 American television seasons
2011 American television seasons
The Big Bang Theory seasons